Timeless Departure is the debut full-length studio album by the Swedish melodic death metal band Skyfire, released on 12 March 2001 by Hammerheart Records. Common themes on the album include death, mysticism, and armageddon.

Track listing
 "Intro" – 2:05 [Music: Hanner/Edlund]
 "Fragments of Time" – 3:32 [Music: Hanner/Reinholdz, Lyrics: Hanner/Björk]
 "The Universe Unveils" – 4:56 [Music: Hanner/Edlund, Lyrics: Björk]
 "By God Forsaken" – 4:57 [Music: Hanner/Edlund, Lyrics: Hanner]
 "Timeless Departure" – 6:49 [Music: Edlund/Hanner, Lyrics: Björk]
 "Breed Through Me, Bleed for Me" – 5:10 [Music: Hanner/Edlund, Lyrics: Hallin]
 "Dimensions Unseen" – 4:54 [Music: Hanner/Edlund, Lyrics Björk/Wenngren]
 "Skyfire" – 3:52 [Music: Edlund/Hanner, Lyrics: Björk]
 "From Here to Death" – 5:32 [Music: Edlund/Hanner, Lyrics Björk]

The positions of track 4 "By God Forsaken" and track 8 "Skyfire" were juxtaposed on the original Hammerheart CD release's back insert due to a printing error. The 2013 digital re-release by Pivotal Rockordings corrected the mislabeled track listing.

Credits

Band members
 Martin Hanner − guitar, keyboards
 Andreas Edlund − guitar, keyboards
 Jonas Sjögren − bass
 Henrik Wenngren − death vocals
 Tobias Björk − drums

Production and other
 Produced, engineered and mixed by Tommy Tägtgren and Skyfire.
 Mastered at Franky's Recording Kitchen by Berthus Westerhuys.

References

Skyfire (band) albums
2001 debut albums
Hammerheart Records albums